Ken Weatherley (born 24 November 1947) is a British former professional tennis player.

Weatherley, a Surrey county player, was educated at the Millfield School and University of Cambridge. He made the main draw of the 1972 Wimbledon Championships. A former Wimbledon committee member, he founded the charity Tennis First which helps fund young players. He was influential in getting funding for a 12-year old Emma Raducanu.

References

External links
 
 

1947 births
Living people
British male tennis players
English male tennis players
Tennis people from Surrey
Alumni of the University of Cambridge
People educated at Millfield